The mottled spinetail (Telacanthura ussheri) is a species of swift in the family Apodidae.
It is found in Angola, Benin, Burkina Faso, Cameroon, Central African Republic, Republic of the Congo, Democratic Republic of the Congo, Ivory Coast, Equatorial Guinea, Gabon, Gambia, Ghana, Guinea, Guinea-Bissau, Kenya, Liberia, Malawi, Mali, Mozambique, Niger, Nigeria, Senegal, Sierra Leone, Somalia, South Africa, Tanzania, Togo, Uganda, Zambia, and Zimbabwe.

References

External links
 Mottled spinetail  - Species text in The Atlas of Southern African Birds.

mottled spinetail
Birds of Sub-Saharan Africa
mottled spinetail
Taxonomy articles created by Polbot